White County High School is a public high school located in Sparta, Tennessee. The school serves the  population of White County from grades 9 through 12.

Leadership
White County High School Principals

 G.C. Sipple	1909–1912
 Walter Rogers	1912–1913
 A.E. Crislip	1913–1914
 Paul E. Doran	1914–1917
 Claude Lowry	1917–1919
 Joel M. Barnes	1919–1925
 J.C. Fooshee	1925–1931
 Walter Fowler	1931–1937
 C.O. Jett	1937–1938
 W.A. Walker	1938–1947
 Quill Cope	1947–1951
 A.C. Haston	1951–1958
 James Scott	1958–1959
 Everett Mitchell	1959–1961
 Frank Medley	1961–1964
 Charles H. Sarver	1964–1978
 Charles Dycus	1978–2007
 Dr. Barry Roberts	2007–2012
 Grant Swallows	2012–2020
 Greg Wilson     2020–

Notable alumni
 Paul Bailey – Tennessee state senator
 David Culley – NFL coach; former head coach of the Houston Texans
 Kellie Harper – College basketball coach; current head coach of the Tennessee Lady Vols basketball team
 Stan Mitchell – Former NFL player Miami Dolphins
 Ethan Roberts – Major League Baseball pitcher
  Erin Foster and Jeremy Bechtel - Missing teenagers

References

External links
 

Public high schools in Tennessee
Buildings and structures in White County, Tennessee